Indonesia sent a delegation to compete at the 1976 Summer Paralympics in Toronto, Ontario, Canada. Its athletes finished twenty sixth in the overall medal count.

Medalists

See also
 1976 Paralympic Games
 1976 Olympic Games
 Indonesia at the Paralympics
 Indonesia at the Olympics
 Indonesia at the 1976 Summer Olympics

References 

Nations at the 1976 Summer Paralympics
1976
Summer Paralympics